Fakear, born Théo Le Vigoureux on 13 May 1991, is a French DJ, musician and producer of electronic music.

Musical style and influence 
Boasting a distinct style akin to that of French musician and producer CloZee, Fakear's music is best described as "world bass," a term also used to describe CloZee's music. 

Many of his songs are characterized by East Asian influences; there's an emphasis on melody, transparency, the focus on individual instruments, and the use of word orientation. Specifically, Japanese influences. 

Japanese music often looks to represent natural sounds—and the sounds of life itself—through the use of percussion, wind and string instruments. In traditional Japanese music, there is a noticeable absence of regular chords and a sparse rhythm. All of the rhythms are 'ma'-based and silence is an important part of the songs. Many of these aspects of Japanese music can be heard in Fakear's music.

Discography

Albums

Singles 

BIRD, 2011, digital album
 PICTURAL EP, 2011, digital album
 BACKSTREET EP, 2011, digital album
 Washin' Machine, 2012, digital album
 Morning In Japan, 2013, EP
 Dark Lands, 2013, EP
 SAUVAGE, 2014, EP
 ASAKUSA, 2015, EP
 Animal, 2016, album
 Vegetal, 2016, EP
 Morning in Japan (Deluxe Edition), 2017, EP
 Karmaprana, 2017, EP
 All Glows, 2018, album
 Everything Will Grow Again, 2020, album

External links 
 
 Fakear's Soundcloud

References 

1991 births
Living people
Counter Records artists
French electronic musicians
Musicians from Caen